This is a list of listed buildings in the parish of Arbroath And St Vigeans in Angus, Scotland.

List 

|}

Key

See also 
 List of listed buildings in Arbroath, Angus - for listed buildings within the boundaries of Arbroath. 
 List of listed buildings in Angus

Notes

References
 All entries, addresses and coordinates are based on data from Historic Scotland. This data falls under the Open Government Licence

Arbroath And St Vigeans